Isaac Mandla Simelane (born 8 November 1967) is a Swazi long-distance runner. He competed in the men's marathon at the 1996 Summer Olympics.

References

External links
 

1967 births
Living people
Athletes (track and field) at the 1992 Summer Olympics
Athletes (track and field) at the 1996 Summer Olympics
Swazi male long-distance runners
Swazi male marathon runners
Olympic athletes of Eswatini
Place of birth missing (living people)